Ramachandrapuram revenue division (or Ramachandrapuram division) is an administrative division in the Konaseema district of the Indian state of Andhra Pradesh. It is one of the 3 revenue divisions in the district which consists of 5 mandals under its administration. Ramachandrapuram is the divisional headquarters.

Administration 
The 5 mandals in Ramachandrapuram revenue division are:

See also 
List of revenue divisions in Andhra Pradesh
List of mandals in Andhra Pradesh

References 

Revenue divisions in Konaseema district